Baku International Bus Terminal is a bus terminal located in Baku, Azerbaijan. The foundation stone for the complex was laid in 2004, and construction work was carried out by local firm "Baku 21st century".  Baku International Bus Terminal was opened officially on 12 February 2009. It is the biggest bus terminal in the Commonwealth of Independent States countries. Its design resembles a ship. It is located on Sumgait highway, in the entry to Baku city.

About the complex

The complex handles up to 950 bus movements every day across domestic and international routes, serving around 20,000 passengers. The terminal has four floors served by 14 escalators and 10 lifts. It also features a 93-bed hotel, 700-space car park, shopping mall of 800 shops, 500-seat canteen, bank, medical center, postal office, and waiting and VIP rooms. There is also a station supervisor's office and bus drivers` rest room facilities. The complex also has its own 35 kV auxiliary power station and five transformers.

Construction
Materials used during the construction as well as equipment installed here were delivered from Italy, Japan, Korea, Switzerland, France, Ukraine, Turkey, Iran, China, Russia, the United Arab Emirates, and India.

Subway station
Avtovağzal subway station opened on April 19, 2016.

Design
The author of the design is Kamal Musakhanov, ARCON company.

References

External links

Buildings and structures in Baku
Bus transport in Azerbaijan
Bus stations in Asia